A chain letter is a message that attempts to convince the recipient to make a number of copies and pass them on to a certain number of recipients. The "chain" is an exponentially growing pyramid (a tree graph) that cannot be sustained indefinitely. 

Common methods used in chain letters include emotionally manipulative stories, get-rich-quick pyramid schemes, and the exploitation of superstition to threaten the recipient. Originally, chain letters were letters sent by mail; today, chain letters are often sent electronically via email, social network sites, and text messages.

Types 
There are two main types of chain letter:

 Hoaxes: Hoaxes attempt to trick or defraud users. A hoax could be malicious, instructing users to delete a file necessary to the operating system by claiming it is a virus. It could also be a scam that convinces users to spread the letter to other people for a specific reason, or send money or personal information. Phishing attacks could fall into this.
 Urban legends: Urban legends are designed to be redistributed and usually warn users of a threat or claim to be notifying them of important or urgent information. Another common form are the emails that promise users monetary rewards for forwarding the message or suggest that they are signing something that will be submitted to a particular group. Urban legends usually have no negative effect aside from wasted time.

In the United States, chain letters that request money or other items of value and promise a substantial return to the participants (such as the infamous Make Money Fast scheme) are illegal.

Some colleges and military bases have passed regulations stating that in the private mail of college students and military personnel, respectively, chain letters are not authorized and will be thrown out. However, it is often difficult to distinguish chain letters from genuine correspondence.

Channels

Print

The oldest known channel for chain letters is written, or printed, on letters on paper. These might be exchanged hand-to-hand or distributed through the mail. One notorious early example was the "Prosperity Club" or "Send-a-Dime" letter. This letter started in Denver, Colorado in 1935, based on an earlier luck letter. It soon swamped the Denver post office with hundreds of thousands of letters before spilling into St. Louis and other cities.

Chain letters take religious perspectives to the extremes, especially when relating to Christianity. Often these letters originate from photocopy centers, claiming to have originated from the Pope, with the intent of persuading people to make copies of such letters. The content usually gives one or two examples of people, sometimes public figures, who obeyed and were rewarded and of others who disobeyed and suffered heavily, which may even include cases of deaths and of someone becoming a millionaire overnight. These types of letters will flourish for some days and will die out naturally, partly based on the economic realities of recipients, and possibly because they may also reason that if that was truly the original letter, then it cannot contain cases of people who had broken or continued the chain.

Email
Some email messages sent as chain letters may seem fairly harmless; for example, a grammar school student wishing to see how many people can receive his/her email for a science project, but they can grow exponentially and be hard to stop. Infamously, the salacious Claire Swire email spread in a chain-like fashion when its recipient sought to learn Swire's identity.  

Messages sometimes include phony promises from companies or wealthy individuals (such as Bill Gates) promising a monetary reward to everyone who receives the message. They may also be politically motivated, such as "Save the Scouts, forward this to as many friends as possible" or a warning that a popular TV or radio show may be forced off the air. Some, like the Hawaiian Good Luck Totem, which has spread in thousands of forms, threaten users with bad luck if not forwarded.

There are many forms of chain email that threaten death or the taking of one's soul by telling tales of others' deaths, such as the Katu Lata Kulu chain email, stating that if it is not forwarded, the receivers of the message will be killed by a spirit.

Platforms like Facebook and YouTube can host chain letters playing with users' emotions. They may also be in the form of warnings, such as stories of escaped convicts, which urge the reader to pass the message on. One chain letter distributed on MSN Hotmail began, "Hey it's Tara and John the directors of MSN"... and subsequently claimed readers' accounts would be deleted if they did not pass on the message.

Another common form of email chain letter is the virus hoax and a form of cyberbullying.

Web communities
Chain letters within social media platforms became widespread on Myspace (in the form of Myspace bulletins) and YouTube (in the form of video comments) as well as on Facebook through messages or applications. For instance, the chain post/email of Carmen Winstead, supposedly about a girl from Indiana who was pushed down a sewage drain in a firedrill, states that, "if you do not repost/send this to 10 people, Carmen will find you and kill you." Chain letters are often coupled with intimidating hoaxes or the promise of providing the sender with "secret" information once they have forwarded the message.

Legality

A chain letter may qualify as a fraudulent activity, as in the case of a pyramid scheme, which asks recipients to funnel money up the chain while requesting the letter be distributed to multiple new recipients.

The legality of chain letters comes into question when they attempt to funnel monetary value to a single recipient. When a chain letter suggests a game of chance or a lottery with an opportunity for financial gain, it is considered fraudulent under Title 18, United States Code, Section 1302, the Postal Lottery Statute. Chain letters that ask for items of minor value, such as business cards or recipes, are not covered by this law.

If pyramid scheme chain letters are sent through email, it may constitute wire fraud. An email chain letter may contain trojans or another type of computer virus that is covered under the Computer Fraud and Abuse Act (CFAA) [18 U.S.C. Section 1030]. This law makes it illegal to distribute computer codes or place them in the stream of commerce if their intent is to cause damage or economic loss.

See also
 Postcrossing
 Copypasta
 Gratis Internet
 Jessica Mydek hoax letter
 Mail and wire fraud
 Make money fast
 Multi-level marketing
 Spam
 Virus hoax

Similar distribution
 Faxlore – distribution of chain-letters or similar material by fax machine

References

Bibliography

 Dean, Athena. All That Glitters Is Not Gold: Breaking Free from the Sweet Deceit of MLM, 1998, Winepress Publishing, 

 Squier, Dan. The Truth About Chain Letters, 1990, Premier Publishers, 
 Tartaglia, Gary. Shattered Dreams: How to Avoid Costly Mistakes in Multi-level Marketing, 1985, Targeted Communications, 
 Walsh, James. You Can't Cheat an Honest Man: How Ponzi Schemes & Pyramid Frauds Work, 1998 Merritt Publishing,

External links
 A discussion of the history and various types of chain letters (from Snopes.com)
 An example of a "Send-a-dime" letter
 Break the chain
 
 Chain Letter Evolution, Daniel W. VanArsdale. A historical analysis, including an archive of actual letters.
 Pay the Thought Forward
 What's wrong with chain letters?

Curses
Email
Letters (message)
Luck